Rhododendron beesianum (宽钟杜鹃) is a rhododendron species native to northeastern Myanmar, southeastern Tibet, and southwestern Sichuan and northwestern Yunnan in China, where it grows at altitudes of . The flowers are pinkish white to pink.

It was discovered in 1902 by the Scottish botanist George Forrest, who sent seeds home. However, though hardy, it is not often found in cultivation.

References

 Diels, Notes Roy. Bot. Gard. Edinburgh. 5: 214. 1912.

beesianum